Peter Cusack is an English artist and musician who is a member of CRiSAP (Creative Research in Sound Arts Practice), and is a research staff member and founding member of the London College of Communication in the University of the Arts London. He was a founding member and director of the London Musicians' Collective.

He is best known as a member of the avant garde musical quartet, Alterations (1978–1986; with Steve Beresford, David Toop, and Terry Day), and the creator of field and wildlife recording-based albums including:

Where Is the Green Parrot? (1999) with tracks like "Toy Shop (Two Small Boys Go Shopping)" and "Siren", which are just as advertised.
Day for Night (2000), with Max Eastley. This features "duets" between Eastley's kinetic sculpture and Cusack's field recordings.
Baikal Ice (2003), featuring tracks like "Banging Holes In Ice" and "Floating Icicles Rocked By Waves" and "Falling In".

Cusack  has been involved in a wide range of projects throughout his career. Several of his pieces have been reviewed in Leonardo Music Journal, the annual music Journal published by MIT Press. He has also curated an album for Leonardo Music Journal.

He is currently research fellow on the Engineering and Physical Sciences Research Council's multidisciplinary 'Positive Soundscapes Project'.

Musical interests
Cusack is particularly interested in environmental sound and acoustic ecology. He has examined the sound properties of areas such as Lake Baikal, Siberia, and the Azerbaijan oil fields, and is interested in how sounds change as people migrate and as technology changes.

In 1998, Cusack started the "Your Favorite London Sound" project. The goal is to find out what London noises are found appealing by people who live in London. This was so popular that it has been repeated in Chicago, Beijing, and other cities. He is involved in the "Sound & The City" art project using sounds from Beijing in October 2005.

Cusack's Sounds From Dangerous Places is a project to collect sounds from sites which have sustained major environmental damage. Sites that Cusack is working on include Chernobyl, the Azerbaijan oil fields, and areas around controversial dams on the Tigris and Euphrates river systems in south east Turkey.

Cusack's performances are a central part of the book Haunted Weather: Music, Silence, and Memory (Toop, 2004) by his old collaborator and respected music critic and author, David Toop. Toop investigates the use of environmental sound and electronic instruments in experimental music in his book.

Other performances
With clarinetist Simon Mayo, he formed the duo known as "A Touch of the Sun". His first "major" recording was part of Fred Frith's 1974 record, "Guitar Solos".

He was one of the first to play the bouzouki in England, which gained him the respect of London's musical avant garde.

As a musician, he has collaborated with artists such as Clive Bell, Nic Collins, Alterations, Chris Cutler, Max Eastley, Evan Parker, Hugh Davies, Annette Krebs and Eastern Mediterranean singer Viv Corringham.

A live performance with Nicolas Collins was released as "A Host, of Golden Daffodils" in 1999.

Selected Reviews
Voila Enough! 1979–1981
Culled from performances in Bracknell, Tilburg, and Berlin between 1979 and 1981, Voila Enough! is a snapshot of a chaotic and intensely creative quartet featuring Peter Cusack, Terry Day, David Toop, and Steve Beresford (principally on guitar, percussion, flutes, and piano, respectively, but also a bewildering number of instruments, conventional and unconventional)...Alterations' music redefines itself from moment to moment, both in terms of its overall structure and the material used to build it. Nearly a quarter of a century on, its power to captivate, infuriate, and have you falling off your chair in hysterics is entirely undimmed. (Dan Warburton, Allmusic)
Baikal Ice
You can hear the vast spaces, the majesty of the frozen lake, and the 'pittoresque' of the location through the wind, bird, and human sounds, but also through the acoustical features of the recordings. We can hear unusual bird songs, children playing with an outdoor PA system, Cusack in his daily routine (mediated by his very dry sense of humour). The recordings are crystal clear and ... create their own stories and convey a sense of here and now...these recordings disclose a unique soundworld. This reviewer would not be surprised if a compilation album of remixes/reworkings based on these recordings surfaced soon. (emphasis added; François Couture, Allmusic)
Where is the Green Parrot?
"...Cusack's field recordings are blended and sequenced against a light tracery of studio playing. Two main sections bring a structural cohesion to this grainy collection of 'pieces, recordings and in-betweens'...", (The Wire, 7/00, p.64)
Day for Night
"This CD represents a 25-year collaboration between renowned British avant-garde improviser Peter Cusack and instrument builder and sculptor Max Eastley. With numerous releases on ReR and Incus, the two musicians are mainstays of the British improvised music world...The duo creates intriguing delicate compositions with these instruments...."(Skip Jansen, Allmusic)
Your Favourite London Sounds
A new disc from the tireless London Musicians' Collective embarks on a sonic journey in their own city, asking Londoners, "What is your favorite London sound and why?" They received hundreds of responses, and musician Peter Cusack took it upon himself to hunt down and record those sounds, 40 of which appear here.(Kenneth Goldsmith, New York Press, Vol 15, Issue 9, 26 February 2002)

Activities related to music
He co-founded an artist-owned record label called "Bead Records" which has released many previously unavailable pieces in 1972. It had released more than 30 albums, as of 2007.

In 1975 Derek Bailey, Steve Beresford, Max Boucher, Paul Burwell, Jack Cooke, Peter Cusack, Hugh Davies, Madelaine and Martin Davidson, Richard Leigh, Evan Parker, John Russell, David Toop, Philipp Wachsmann and Colin Wood formed the journal MUSICS, later described as "an impromental experivisation arts magazine".

Cusack produces the monthly radio program "Vermilion Sounds" with Isobel Clouter. Vermilion Sounds explores environmental sounds and is broadcast by Resonance FM in London. John Levack Drever, writing in Soundscape, comments:
Of significant note is the work of Peter Cusack and Isobel Clouter (from the British Library Sound Archive who we now welcome onto the UKISC Management Committee), who have done a sterling job producing Vermilion Sounds—a weekly radio show for Resonance FM...

Other projects
Soundlines: City of London Festival educational project on music and environmental sound in East London schools (April to November 2003).
Baku, 5 Quarters at the University of Baku, Azerbaijan.  This was a collaboration with Swiss video artist Ursula Biemann in 2004.
Urban Grime, exhibition at the Museum of London Sept 2003 to Jan 2004
Send+Receive Festival performance & workshops, Winnipeg, Canada 2004:
LMC Guitar Festival performances, Museum of Garden History, London 2004
 Frère Jacques et autres pièces à Francis: Expositions. 1997. Saint-Fons, with Ron Haselden, a British artist living in the French town of Brizard, in Brittany. This was a well-known interactive multimedia piece featuring the song Frère Jacques.

International collaborations
Cusack 's activities take him far afield. He had done work in Austria, Canada, Turkey, Beijing, Azerbaijan, Siberia, China's most western province, Xinjiang and France.
He also spent 2 years at the STEIM studio in Amsterdam, honing his electronic music skills.

Selected recordings
Your Favourite London Sounds 1998–2001, Peter Cusack, Resonance (2002)
 Day For Night,  Peter Cusack, Max Eastley, Paradigm (2000). The compilation of recordings from a 25-year collaboration.
Interruptions, Terry Day, EMANEM 4125; Cusack plays on two tracks, recordings from 1978–1981.
Voila Enough! 1979–1981 (Atavistic ALP239CD) – CD release of the group Alterations (Steve Beresford, Peter Cusack, Terry Day, David Toop)
Baikal Ice, Peter Cusack, RER Megacorp / IODA (Spring 2003)
Where is the Green Parrot?, Peter Cusack, RER Megacorp / IODA (1999)
The Horse Was Alive, The Cow Was Dead, Peter Cusack album with 46 tracks
Butlers Wharf, Peter Cusack
Ghosts & Monsters: Technology & Personality in Contemporary Music, Composer: Robert Ashley, Frieder Butzmann, John Cage, Cornelius Cardew, Henning Christiansen, et al., Conductor: Christian von Borries, Guy Protheroe, Performers: Peter Cusack, Margaret Leng Tan, Jerry Hunt, Shelley Hirsch, Berliner Philharmoniker, Emf Media (2 May 2000) includes an extract from a Host, of Golden Daffodils – Nicolas Collins, Peter Cusack
Haunted Weather, assorted artists, Staubgold Germany, 25 May 2004, includes "Flight Path Trace" by Peter Cusack (companion CD to Ghosts and Monsters: Technology and Personality in Contemporary Music, Leonardo Music Journal 8 (1998), Leonardo / MIT Press, 1998)
Not Necessarily "English Music": A collection of experimental music from Great Britain, 1960–1977, curated by David Toop, Leonard Music Journal CD Series Volume 11, includes Geese recorded in 1974 by Peter Cusack and Simon Mayo (A Touch of the Sun), the companion CD to 2001 Volume of Leonardo Music Journal, MIT Press, 2001.
Nightjars and Roe Deer, and Squabble (both from CD to Musicworks #59, Peter Cusack) included in Songs Soaring, (René van Peer, catalogue for festival Whistling in the Dark/Pfeifen in Walde, organised by Matthias Osterwold and Nicolas Collins in Podewil, Berlin (Germany), 9 to 18 September 1994, organised by Matthias Osterwold and Nicolas Collins in Podewil, Berlin (Germany), 9 to 18 September 1994, pub. by Volker Straebel and Matthias Osterwold, in association with Nicolas Collins, Valerian Maly and Elke Moltrecht. Distribution through Podewil and Maly Verlag, 1994.)
TECHNO MIT STÖRUNGEN, an album recorded at festival "music unlimited" at Alter Schlachthof Wels, Austria, 11 November 1995. The album features Peter Cusack playing "bousouki & interactive birds"
Operet, Peter Cusack and Viv Corringham, Rere121
 Sounds from dangerous places book with audio CDs

Curations
Interpreting the Soundscape,  curated by Peter Cusack, contributions by Tonya Wimmer, Andrea Polli and Joe Gilmore, Jacob Kirkegaard, Chris Watson, Rafal Flejter, Chris DeLaurenti, Christina Kubisch, Charles Stankievech, Sonic Postcards, Yannick Dauby and Pascal Battus.  LMJ CD Series Volume 16 accompanying the 2006 Volume of Leonardo Music Journal, Leonardo Music Journal Volume 16 (2006), MIT press, 2006.

Selected publications
"Ghosts and Monsters": Contributors' Notes", Alexander Abramovitch Krejn, Christian von Borries, John Cage, Andrew Culver, John Tilbury, Paul de Marinis, Robert Ashley, Henning Christiansen, Alvin Lucier, Peter Cusack, Shelley Hirsch, Jerry Hunt, Michael Schell, Frieder Butzmann, Michael Snow, Leonardo Music Journal, Vol. 8, Ghosts and Monsters: Technology and Personality in Contemporary Music (1998), pp. 64–74, MIT Press, 1998.
The Positive Soundscape Project: A re-evaluation of environmental sound, Mags Adams, Angus Carlyle, Peter Cusack, Bill Davies, Ken Hume, Paul Jennings, Chris Plack, Research Proposal.
Dialogue, Peter Cusack, Soundscape—The Journal of Acoustic Ecology 1 (2) p8, 2000.

References
Haunted Weather: Music, Silence, and Memory, David Toop, Serpent's Tail, 1 July 2004,

Notes

External links
Peter Cusack's official website
Favourite sounds project's website
Sounds from dangerous places project's website
Peter Cusack entry in Allmusic, François Couture
Alterations album reviews. This album was recorded in 1981 and released in 1999.
Bead Records website, the record company Cusack co-founded in 1972, which has released more than 30 albums.

Year of birth missing (living people)
Living people
English electronic musicians
English experimental musicians
Field recording